Lim Ju-hwan (born May 18, 1982) is a South Korean actor. He is best known for his leading roles in the television dramas Tamra, the Island (2009), Ugly Alert (2013), Uncontrollably Fond (2016) and The Bride of Habaek (2017).

Early life and education

When he was a senior in high school, Lim joined the theater group called Kwangto, an acronym of Kwangdae Tokkaebi referring to traditional performers and hobgoblins in Korean, where he was first introduced to theatrical performance. Lim then played the role of the pastor in The Good Doctor by Neil Simon and won the prize of best performance in the Fourth Youth Theater Festival in 2000. He also directed the play, Pay Tuition Back, at the school festival. He continues to maintain a good friendship with fellow actor Shin Dong-wook, whom he met at the time.

After graduating from high school, Lim began his professional career in modeling at The Men, a modeling and acting agency. He also enrolled at Daejin University for his undergraduate and graduate studies in theatre and film.

Career

2004–2008: Beginnings
Lim made his first professional television debut on Magic, aired on SBS in 2004, and made his film debut in A Millionaire's First Love in 2006, followed by a series of supporting roles, notably in The Snow Queen (2006) and Boys Over Flowers (2009). He received favorable reviews for his performance as a blind painter in episode 10 of Auction House, a 2007 TV series revolving around the art world which aired on MBC.

2009–2010: Rising popularity and breakthrough
Lim's breakthrough came in his first leading role in the 2009 MBC series Tamra, the Island. Set in Jeju Island, Haenam in South Jeolla Province, it was a hybrid form of TV drama that combined romantic comedy and historical fiction. It portrayed the relationship between Koreans and foreigners in 17th century Joseon. Though it received low ratings, Tamra, the Island gained a cult following. Lim later won New Actor of the Year at the 2009 Korean Culture and Entertainment Awards for his performance.

To capitalize on his growing fan base in Japan due to Tamra, the Island, Lim starred in the 2-episode special drama Marriage War of Doenjang-kun and Natto-chan, about a Korean man and a Japanese woman who fall in love while working together on a Korea-Japan joint project.

2011–2012: Military enlistment 
What's Up, the long-delayed musical campus drama that Lim filmed in 2010, finally aired on cable channel MBN in 2011. It was written by renowned drama scribe Song Ji-na (Sandglass) and is the story of college students learning acting and performance arts in the university's musical theatre department. Lim played the leading role of Jang Je-hun, a cynical outsider who becomes completely immersed in the world of musicals. He followed that with a supporting role as a warm-hearted homeless man with Tourette's syndrome in the film The Suicide Forecast in 2011.

In 2011, Lim enlisted for his mandatory military service. During basic training, he fainted due to heart problems and was hospitalized for 3 months. He then completed his service despite being given the option for an early discharge. Prior to entering military service Lim left his agency Yedang Entertainment.

2013–present: New agency and comeback
After his military discharge he moved to Blossom Entertainment. In 2013, he made his acting comeback in the lead role as a devoted brother in 2013 SBS daily drama Ugly Alert, followed by a villain role in the 2014 film The Con Artists as well as supporting roles in historical drama Shine or Go Crazy and romantic comedy series Oh My Ghost in 2015, romance melodrama Uncontrollably Fond in 2016, and fantasy romance series The Bride of Habaek in 2017. He acted as a Japanese prosecutor Fukuda in 2019 MBC's period spy drama, Different Dreams.

Filmography

Film

Television series

Music video

Theater

Awards and nominations

References

External links
Lim Ju-hwan at Blossom Entertainment 

1982 births
Living people
Daejin University alumni
South Korean male film actors
South Korean male stage actors
South Korean male television actors